Diego González Parro (born 24 September 1987 in Santiago) is a Chilean sailor, who specialized in two-person dinghy (470) class. He represented Chile, along with his partner Benjamin Grez, at the 2012 Summer Olympics, and has also been training throughout most of his sporting career for Team VTR Yacht Club in his native Santiago, under his personal coach Cristian Noe. As of June 2015, Gonzalez is ranked among the top 400 sailors in the world for the two-person dinghy class by the International Sailing Federation.

Coming from a sporting pedigree, Gonzalez shared the same discipline with his father and 1984 Olympian Alberto Gonzalez, one of the most successful sailors in Chile's history and a five-time world champion in the lightning class. He and his father tried unsuccessfully to compete for the 2008 Summer Olympics in Beijing, until the latter had decided to retire from sailing.

At the 2012 Summer Olympics in London, Gonzalez teamed up with his new partner and helmsman Benjamin Grez in the men's 470 class after having achieved a berth and finishing thirty-first from the World Championships in Barcelona, Spain. The Chilean duo failed to advance into the final round of the ten-race opening series, as they finished last overall with 196 net points in a fleet of twenty-seven boats.

Notes

References

External links
 
 
 
 Diego Gonzalez Parro at NBC 2012 Olympics website

1987 births
Living people
Chilean male sailors (sport)
Olympic sailors of Chile
Sailors at the 2012 Summer Olympics – 470
Pan American Games medalists in sailing
Pan American Games gold medalists for Chile
Sailors at the 2007 Pan American Games
Sailors at the 2011 Pan American Games
Medalists at the 2011 Pan American Games
Sportspeople from Santiago